Christopher Joseph Harker (29 June 1937 – 5 September 2014) was an English professional footballer who played as a goalkeeper.

On the 26 December 1962, in icy conditions and torrential rain, Harker collided with Sunderland striker Brian Clough, and the latter sustained career-ending injuries.

He also finished the career of Joe Hayes of Manchester City after an appalling challenge.

References

1937 births
2014 deaths
People from Shiremoor
Footballers from Tyne and Wear
English footballers
Association football goalkeepers
Backworth Welfare F.C. players
West Allotment Celtic F.C. players
Newcastle United F.C. players
Consett A.F.C. players
Aberdeen F.C. players
Bury F.C. players
Grimsby Town F.C. players
Rochdale A.F.C. players
Stockton F.C. players
English Football League players